Jovani Fashion, Ltd. is a fashion house focusing on the prom and evening wear sectors.

History and operations 

Jovani Fashion was founded in 1980 by Jacob Maslavi and his sons, Abraham and Saul Maslavi. The company initially started as a 10-person operation, designing and manufacturing 15 styles of dresses for specialty boutiques.

In 1996, Jovani brought on American designer Sherri Hill to assist in the expansion of their prom and pageant market. The designer remained with the fashion house for the next 12 years.

In 2007, Julie DuRocher was named as the new head designer for Jovani. DuRocher presented a 14-piece Jovani couture collection at a runway show held at the 2012 Brooklyn Fashion Week.

In 2014, Jovani creations were featured at Mercedes-Benz Fashion Week in Russia. The 60 piece collection shown helped introduce the brand to the Russian market.

Today, Jovani Fashion remains family owned and has grown to a 50-person company. Its website says it serves over 2,000 retailers worldwide. Its retailers include Neiman Marcus.

The company produces over 600 new designs annually. Jovani has expanded to include bridal, homecoming, cocktail and evening dress collections, as well as a custom couture line.

On February 18, 2016, JVN by Jovani, a partner company to Jovani, was launched by Saul Maslavi.

Celebrity and editorial appearances 

Celebrities including Miranda Lambert, Carrie Underwood, Selena Gomez, Ariana Grande, Taylor Swift and Jewel, have all worn Jovani's signature pieces for various red carpet, charity, and social events. In 2014, Jovani dresses worn by country music star Miranda Lambert were exhibited in The Country Music Hall of Fame in Nashville, Tennessee.

The Jovani collections have had editorial exposure in publications such as WWD and have also been featured on prime-time television shows such as The Voice.

Kim Kardashian wore a Jovani dress in the January 2012 issue of Glamour magazine.

In 2014, X Factor's Fifth Harmony was chosen to front the brand's 2014 campaign. The powerhouse group agreed to represent the Jovani 2014 prom line. They also participated in a contest in which the group performed at the winner's prom.

In April 2015, Persian singer Googoosh wore a Jovani evening dress during her concert in Montreal Canada.

Singer Ciara wore a couture Jovani gown for her appearance at the Vanity Fair Oscar Party in 2017.

On June 13, 2019, Real Housewife of New York, Luann De Lesseps, released a music track "Feelin' Jovani".

Charity 

In 2013, Jovani partnered with the non-profit organisation Operation PROM to provide prom dresses to underprivileged high school students.

Jovani also makes in kind donations to the Society of Memorial Sloan-Kettering Cancer Center, which are used at the annual Pediatric Prom.

In 2017, Jovani donated enough prom dresses for every high school girl to choose her own prom dress in the Yonkers school district in NY.

References

External links 

Jovani Profile on Mercedes-Benz Fashion Week Russia

Clothing companies based in New York City
Clothing manufacturers
Clothing brands of the United States